Hailey Langland (born August 2, 2000) is an American snowboarder who won a bronze medal in slopestyle at Winter X Games XX. Langland made her first Olympic appearance at age 17 representing the United States in big air and slopestyle at the 2018 Winter Olympics in PyeongChang. She competed at the 2022 Winter Olympics, in Women's big air, and Women's slopestyle.

Career 
Langland spent her 2017 summer training with the US Snowboard Team at High Cascade Snowboard Camp. In 2018, she had a "Signature Session" at High Cascade.

She won the gold medal in the Big Air event new to the 2017 Winter X Games, with a clutch performance in the final minutes. She landed a double cork, becoming the first female rider to land the trick in X-Games history.

She competed at the 2019–20 FIS Freestyle Ski World Cup, 2020–21 FIS Freestyle Ski World Cup, and 2021–22 FIS Freestyle Ski World Cup.

References

External links
 
 
 
 
 

2000 births
Living people
X Games athletes
American female snowboarders
Place of birth missing (living people)
Snowboarders at the 2018 Winter Olympics
Snowboarders at the 2022 Winter Olympics
Olympic snowboarders of the United States
Snowboarders at the 2016 Winter Youth Olympics
21st-century American women